The Caribbean Conference of Churches is a regional ecumenical body with 33 member churches in 34 territories across the Dutch, English, French and Spanish speaking territories of the Caribbean. It was founded in 1973.

Member Churches 
African Methodist Episcopal (AME)
Assemblea Nacional Presbyteriana de Cuba
Eglise De Dieu (Ebenezer) - Haiti
Ejercito de Salvacion - Cuba
Evangelical Lutheran Church - Caribbean Synod
Evangelical Lutheran Church in Suriname
Fraternidad Bautista - Cuba
Iglesia Cristiana Pentecostal - Cuba
Iglesia Episcopal de Cuba
Iglesia Episcopal Dominicana
Iglesia Evangelica Dominicana
Iglesia Metodista Unida de Puerto Rico
Iglesia Metodista de Cuba
Iglesia Reformada Unida de Cuba
Maronite Church - Dominica
Presbytery of Guyana
Maronite Church - Guyana
Salvadoran Lutheran Church
The Antilles Episcopal Conference (Roman Catholic) - Regional
The Church in the Province of the West Indies (Anglican)
The Congregational Union of Guyana
The Ethiopian Orthodox Church - Regional
The Jamaica Baptist Union
The Lutheran Church in Guyana
The Methodist Church in the Caribbean and the Americas
The Moravian Church - East West Indies Province
The Moravian Church - Jamaica
The Moravian Church - Suriname
The Moravian Church - Guyana
The Presbyterian Church of Trinidad and Tobago
The Presbyterian Church of Guyana
The Presbyterian Church in Grenada
The Reformed Church - Suriname
The Salvation Army
The United Church of Jamaica & Grand Cayman
The United Protestant Church of Curaçao

External links 
 
World Council of Churches listing

International Christian organizations
Christian organizations established in 1973
 
Denominational alliances
International organizations based in the Caribbean
Regional councils of churches